The Welland Jr. Canadians are a junior ice hockey team based in Welland, Ontario, Canada.  They play in the Golden Horseshoe division of the Greater Ontario Junior Hockey League.

History
The Welland franchise, under any of its various names, has been a charter member of the Golden Horseshoe "B" since leaving the Niagara District Junior B Hockey League in 1979.

In the mid-1970s, the Cougars co-existed with the Welland Sabres of the Southern Ontario Junior A Hockey League.

Season-by-season results

Notable alumni
Yvon Corriveau
Adam Creighton
Ray Emery
Wayne Groulx
Bill Huard
Matt Johnson
Bob LaForest
Mark LaForest
Lou Nistico
Krzysztof Oliwa
Dan Paille
Bob Sneddon
Cal Clutterbuck
Dan Girardi
Jamie Tardif
Matt Ellis
Paul Bissonnette
Andre Deveaux

External links
Jr. Canadians Webpage
GOJHL Webpage
Jr. Canadians Twitter
Jr. Canadians Facebook
Jr. Canadians Instagram

Golden Horseshoe Junior B Hockey League teams
Sport in Welland